John Linn Hurt (March 10, 1838 – September 13, 1931) was a Democratic politician who served as a member of the Virginia Senate from 1877 until 1895. He was president pro tempore of that body.

References

External links

1838 births
1931 deaths
Democratic Party Virginia state senators
19th-century American politicians
19th-century American lawyers
Virginia lawyers